The 1984 Brown Bears football team was an American football team that represented Brown University during the 1984 NCAA Division I-AA football season. Brown finished fourth in the Ivy League. 

In their first season under head coach John Rosenberg, the Bears compiled a 4–5 record and were outscored 231 to 165. S. Heffernan and T. Love were the team captains. 

The Bears' 4–3 conference record placed fourth in the Ivy League standings. They were outscored 156 to 135 by Ivy opponents. 

Brown played its home games at Brown Stadium in Providence, Rhode Island.

Schedule

References

Brown
Brown Bears football seasons
Brown Bears football